William Forbes Raymond (born William Forbes) was Archdeacon of Northumberland from 1842 to 1853.

The only son of Lieutenant-Colonel William Forbes, Deputy Adjutant-General to the Forces in Ireland, he was educated at Charterhouse and Trinity College, Cambridge. He was Rector of Strethall before his Archdeacon's appointment; and died in retirement on 21 March 1860.

References

1785 births
People educated at Charterhouse School
Alumni of Trinity College, Cambridge
Archdeacons of Northumberland
1860 deaths